The 2013–14 Ohio State Buckeyes men's basketball team represented Ohio State University in the 2013–14 NCAA Division I men's basketball season.  Their head coach was Thad Matta, in his tenth season with the Buckeyes.  The team played its home games at Value City Arena in Columbus, Ohio and was a member of the Big Ten Conference. They finished the season 25–10, 10–8 in Big Ten play to finish in fifth place. They advanced to the semifinals of the Big Ten tournament where they lost to rival Michigan. They received an at-large bid to the NCAA tournament where they lost in the second round to Dayton.

Before the season

Previous season
The Buckeye finished the season with 29-8 overall, 13-5 in Big Ten play and won the Big Ten tournament, they earn a trip to the 2013 NCAA Division I men's basketball tournament, which they were in the 2nd seed in the west, which they defeated Iona in the second round, Iowa State in the third round, Arizona in the sweet sixteen before falling in the elite eight against Wichita State.

Departures

Recruiting

Roster

Schedule

|-
!colspan=9 style="background:#B31021; color:#999999;"| Exhibition

|-
!colspan=9 style="background:#B31021; color:#999999;"| Regular season

|-
!colspan=9 style="background:#B31021; color:#999999;"| Big Ten tournament

|-
!colspan=9 style="background:#B31021; color:#999999;"| NCAA tournament

Source:

Rankings

See also
 2013–14 Ohio State Buckeyes women's basketball team

References

Ohio State Buckeyes men's basketball seasons
Ohio State
Ohio State
Ohio State Buckeyes
Ohio State Buckeyes